ReAniMate: The CoVeRs eP is an EP by the American hard rock band Halestorm. It is the first cover EP by the band. It was released on March 22, 2011 as a digital download. A follow up EP, Reanimate 2.0: The Covers EP, was released on October 15, 2013. The EP features six songs. It peaked at number 20 of the Billboard hard rock albums chart.

Track list

Personnel
 Lzzy Hale - Lead Vocals, Rhythm and Lead Guitar, Keyboard
 Arejay Hale - Drums, Percussion, Backing Vocals
 Joe Hottinger - Lead Guitar, Backing Vocals
 Josh Smith - Bass guitar, Backing Vocals

References

2011 EPs
Atlantic Records EPs
Covers EPs